Emotional is the fourth studio album by Austrian singer and rapper Falco, released in 1986.

Information
Emotional was Falco's second album produced by Bolland and Bolland. The lead single was "The Sound of Musik".  The second single was "Coming Home (Jeanny Part II, One Year Later)". It is a sequel to the Falco song "Jeanny".

The album's cover, a still from the music video for the title track, is a homage to a similar backdrop used by Elvis Presley in his 1968 comeback special.

Track listing
"Emotional" – 4:52
"Kamikaze Cappa" – 5:10
"Crime Time" – 4:24
"Cowboyz and Indianz" – 5:46
"Coming Home (Jeanny Part II, One Year Later)" – 5:32
"The Star of Moon and Sun" – 5:19
"Les Nouveaux Riches" – 4:31
"The Sound of Musik" – 4:56
"The Kiss of Kathleen Turner" – 7:32

2022 Remaster Bonus Disc

The Sound Of Musik (Extended Rock N Soul Version)	10:00
The Sound Of Musik (12" Edit)	7:12
Coming Home (Jeanny Part 2, Ein Jahr Danach) (Extended Version)	7:43
Emotional (Extended Version)	7:38
Emotional (Extended N.Y. Mix)	8:21
Emotional (Extended N.Y. Mix) (English Version)	8:21
Emotional (Her Side Of The Story) 	5:19
	
The Sound Of Musik (Rock N Soul Edit)	4:35
The Sound Of Musik (Single Edit)	4:12
The Sound Of Musik (7" Edit)	4:07
The Sound Of Musik (Full Length Instru-Mental Version)	4:05
The Sound Of Musik (Instru-Mental Version)	2:44
Coming Home (Jeanny Part 2, Ein Jahr Danach) (Special Edited Radio Version)	4:24
Emotional (N.Y. Mix)	4:20
Emotional (N.Y. Mix) (English Version)	4:20
Emotional (English Version)	4:54
Emotional (Her Side Of The Story 7" Edit)	4:09
Crime Time (7" Edit)	3:28

DVD: Live in Frankfurt 1986
The Star Of Moon And Sun
Junge Roemer
Männer Des Westens – Any Kind Of Land
The Kiss Of Kathleen Turner
Jeanny
Crime Time
Munich Girls
Emotional
Coming Home (Jeanny Part 2, Ein Jahr Danach)
Vienna Calling
Rock Me Amadeus

Charts

Weekly charts

Year-end charts

Certifications

References

1986 albums
Falco (musician) albums
Sire Records albums
German-language albums